English Creek may refer to:

English Creek, New Jersey, an unincorporated community
English Creek (New Jersey), a tributary of the Great Egg Harbor River
English Creek (Spring River), a stream in Arkansas and Missouri